Alfred Coppel, Alfredo Jose de Arana-Marini Coppel (November 9, 1921 – May 30, 2004) was an American author. Born in Oakland, he served as a fighter pilot in the United States Army Air Forces during World War II. After his discharge, he started his career as a writer. He became one of the most prolific pulp magazine authors of the 1950s and 1960s, adopting the pseudonyms Robert Cham Gilman and A.C. Marin and writing for a variety of pulp magazines and later "slick" publishers. Though writing in a variety of genres, including action thrillers, he is known for his science fiction stories which comprise both short stories and novels.

Science fiction
Coppel's first science fiction story was "Age of Unreason" (1947) in Amazing Stories. Other short stories include "The Dreamer" (1952) about a man called Denby, who wants to be the first to orbit the moon, published in The Magazine of Fantasy and Science Fiction and reprinted in the anthology Best Short Shorts (1958) edited by Eric Berger. His post-holocaust novel Dark December (1960) describes the aftermath of nuclear war.

As Robert Cham Gilman, he wrote the Rhada  sequence of science fiction novels aimed at the young adult market. These space operas ,set within a galactic empire, comprise The Rebel of Rhada (1968), The Navigator of Rhada (1969), The Starkahn of Rhada (1970) and a prequel called The Warlock of Rhada (1985). The Rebel of Rhada is an expansion, with many changes including a significantly different ending, of "The Rebel of Valkyr," published in 1950 under his own name and included in Brian Aldiss's collection Galactic Empires.

The Burning Mountain: A Novel of the Invasion of Japan (1983) is an alternate history depicting what could have happened if the United States and its allies had been forced to invade Japan in 1946, had the Trinity test of the Fat Man nuclear design on July 16, 1945, failed. This is based on the Operation Coronet and Operation Olympic, United States battle plans for the invasion of Japan, which were rendered moot by Japan's surrender after the atomic bombings of Hiroshima and Nagasaki.

Other books
In 1974, he had a bestseller with the suspense thriller Thirty-Four East about the Arab–Israeli conflict. Another political thriller was The Apocalypse Brigade, 1981, about the United States at war with global terrorism. And based on his own experiences as World War II fighter pilot, Order of Battle, a gritty account of a P-38 Lightning pilot.

References

External links

 
 
 
 A biography of Coppel in German
 Cover of "The Rebel of Rhada"

20th-century American novelists
American male novelists
American science fiction writers
1921 births
2004 deaths
Writers from Oakland, California
United States Army Air Forces officers
United States Army Air Forces pilots of World War II
20th-century American male writers
Military personnel from California